Al-Hussein SC (Irbid) is a professional football club based in Irbid which competes in the Jordanian Pro League.

Al-Hussein (Irbid) participated in the 2005 AFC Cup, winning its group. The club has never won the Jordan League or Jordan FA Cup, but are three-time winners of the Jordan FA Shield and winners of the 2003 Jordan Super Cup.  Most recently, Al-Hussein were beaten finalists in the 2007 Jordan FA Shield.

Stadium
Al-Hussein plays their home games at Al-Hassan Stadium in Irbid. The stadium was built in 1971 and opened in 1976. It is also the home stadium of Al-Arabi and Al-Sareeh. It has a current capacity of 12,000 spectators.

Kits
Al-Hussein's home kit is all yellow shirts and shorts, while their away kit is all black shirts and shorts.

Kit suppliers and shirt sponsors

2019-2020
Royal oaks group
2020-2021
Royal oaks group

Honours

Performance in AFC  and UAFA competitions
 AFC Champions League: 0 appearances
AFC Cup: 1 appearance
2005: Quarterfinals
Arab Club Champions Cup / Arab Champions League: 2 Appearances 
1993:Group stage 
2004-05: First round

Current squad

Managerial history
  Nazar Ashraf (2007–2008)
  Osama Qasem (2008–2010)
  Rateb Al-Dawud (2010–2011)
  Jabbar Hamid (2010–2011)
  Hussam Al-Mawsali (2011)
  Mahmoud Abu Abed (2011)
  Osama Qasem (2011–2013)
  Marinko Koljanin (2013)
  Mohammad Abdel-Azim (2013–2015)
  Osama Qasem (2015)
  Islam Thiabat (2015–2016)
  Issa Al-Turk (2016)
  Bilal Al-Laham (2016–2017)
  Maher Bahri (2017)
  Bilal Al-Laham (2016–2017)
  Mohammad Abdel-Azim (2017–2018)
  Alaa Amrat (2018)
  Bilal Al-Laham (2018–2019)
Ashraf kassem (2019)
OTMAN il Hassanat (2020)
Valeriu Tița (2021)
Osama Qasem (2021) 
Amjad Abu Taima (2022)
Ayman Hakeem (2022)
Hussein Alawneh (2022–present)

References

External links
Al Hussein Club website
nationalfootballteams.com

Football clubs in Jordan
Sport in Irbid
1964 establishments in Jordan